Collector's Series may refer to:

 Collector's Series (Dolly Parton album)
 Collector's Series (The Judds album)
 Collector's Series (Willie Nelson album)

See also
The Collector's Series, Volume One, Celine Dion album
Capitol Collectors Series (disambiguation)